The Tioman Island rock gecko (Cnemaspis limi), also known commonly as the Tioman round-eyed gecko, is a species of gecko, a lizard in the family Gekkonidae. The species is endemic  to Malaysia.

Etymology
The specific name, limi, is in honour of zoologist Kok Peng "Kelvin" Lim (born 1966) of the Raffles Museum, Singapore.

Geographic range
C. limi is found only on Tioman Island (also called Pulau Tioman) in Western Malaysia.

Reproduction
C. limi is oviparous.

References

Further reading
Das I, Grismer LL (2003). "Two New Species of Cnemaspis Strauch, 1887 (Squamata: Gekkonidae) from the Seribuat Archipelago, Pahang and Johor States, West Malaysia". Herpetologica 59 (4): 544–552. (Cnemaspis limi, new species).
Grismer LL (2011). Lizards of Peninsular Malaysia, Singapore and their Adjacent Archipelagos. Frankfurt am Main: Chimaira. 728 pp. .
Grossman W, Tillack F (2004). "Pulau Tioman – Perle im Südchinesischen Meer, Teil 1 ". Reptilia (Münster) 9 (50): 42–49. (in German).

limi
Reptiles described in 2003